Paul Stendel (October 3, 1879 – August 12, 1942) was an American gymnast. He competed in four events at the 1904 Summer Olympics.

References

External links
 

1879 births
1942 deaths
American male artistic gymnasts
Olympic gymnasts of the United States
Gymnasts at the 1904 Summer Olympics
Gymnasts from Berlin
Emigrants from the German Empire to the United States